Çömelek  is a village in Mut district of Mersin Province, Turkey. The village is situated in the Taurus Mountains to the east of Mut. The population of the village was 389 as of 2012. Sason canyon is to the south of the village.

References

External links
Images from the canyon

Villages in Mut District